The Eye of the Monocle (French:L'oeil du monocle) is a 1962 French comedy thriller film directed by Georges Lautner and starring Paul Meurisse, Elga Andersen and Gaia Germani. It is the sequel of The Black Monocle (1961).

Location shooting took place in Corsica.

Cast
 Paul Meurisse as Le commandant Théobald Dromard, dit "Le Monocle"  
 Elga Andersen as Erika Murger  
 Gaia Germani as Diana  
 Charles Millot as Commissaire Matlov  
 Raymond Meunier as Bob Dugoinneau  
 Paul Mercey as Schlumpf  
 Henri Cogan as Archiloque  
 Jean Luisi as Un 'sinistre'  
 Jean-Michel Audin as Un 'sinistre'  
 Josette Demay 
 Michel Duplaix 
 Richard Larke as Major Cyring  
 Barbara Brand as La danseuse  
 Robert Dalban as Poussin  
 Maurice Biraud as Martigue 
 Guy Henry
 Georges Lautner as Un officier allemand

References

Bibliography 
 Rège, Philippe. Encyclopedia of French Film Directors, Volume 1. Scarecrow Press, 2009.

External links 
 

1962 films
French comedy thriller films
1960s comedy thriller films
1960s French-language films
Films directed by Georges Lautner
Films shot in Corsica
Pathé films
1962 comedy films
1960s French films